Die Fussbroichs  is a German television series by WDR Fernsehen. It was the offspring of a German documentary Die Fussbroichs - Ein Kinderzimmer 1979 by Westdeutsches Fernsehen, former name of WDR Fernsehen, shown on August 19, 1979.
The pilot Die Fussbroichs — Eine Kölner Arbeiterfamilie - a documentary of 85 minutes — was shown on February 13, 1990. The television series launched in 1991, the first episode was shown on December 22, 1991, and ended in 2002. The 100th and last — former unbroadcast - episode Check-up was shown on December 26, 2003.

Literature 
 Ute Diehl: Fussbroichs : die einzig wahre Familiengeschichte, Wienand, Köln, 1994,   (German)
 Eike Wenzel: Ballonseide und Schrankwand: Privatheit und Intimität bei den Fussbroichs und in der Docu-Soap., In: Ulrike Bergermann, Hartmut Winkler (Hrsg.): TV-Trash. The TV-show I love to hate. Schüren 2000 (Schriftenreihe der Gesellschaft für Film- und Fernsehwissenschaft (GFF) 9), S. 71–81  (German)

Awards 
 1992: Grimme-Preis Bronze for diretor Ute Diehl.

See also
List of German television series

References

External links
 
 

1990 German television series debuts
2003 German television series endings
German-language television shows
Das Erste original programming